HKK Zrinjski Mostar is a basketball team from the city of Mostar, Bosnia and Herzegovina. The club plays in the Basketball Championship of Bosnia and Herzegovina.

History 
The club is part of the Zrinjski Mostar sport society. Since the national championship was formed in 1997, it has spent all but two seasons in the top league: the inaugural season and the 2003–04 season. For the 2003–04 season, Zrinjski was relegated to the regional Croatian league, but bounced back the following year to return to the top level of play. Since its return to the national championship it has placed in the top half of the table as well as reaching the semifinals in the national cup twice.

The club's current coach is Zoran Glomazić. A feeder club, often known as Zrinjski II, plays in the lower Croatian league. Fans of HKK Zrinjski are known as Ultras.

In 2018, the club won their first National league title.

Achievements

 Basketball Championship of Bosnia and Herzegovina
Champions (1): 2017–18
 A1 League of Herzeg Bosnia 
Champions (1): 2003–04

Players

Current roster

Notable former players

 Josip Sesar
 Bojan Bogdanović
 Marin Rozić
 Pero Dujmović
 Željko Šakić
 Ante Mašić

Notable former coaches
 Nedjeljko Zelenika
 Rudolf Jugo
 Dejan Parežanin
 Boris Džidić
 Ivan Vujičić
 Zoran Glomazić 
 Senad Muminović

External links
Zrinjski website 

Basketball teams in Bosnia and Herzegovina
Basketball teams established in 1992
Sport in Mostar
Croatian sports clubs outside Croatia